Misr lel-Makkasa Sporting Club, simply known as Makkassa, is an Egyptian sports club based in Faiyum, Egypt. The club is related to Misr lel-Makkasa Company (Misr for Central Clearing, Depository and Registry).

Misr lel-Makkasa is mainly known for its professional football team, which currently plays in the Egyptian Second Division, the second highest league in the Egyptian football league system.

The club was formerly known as Hweidi Club and El-Fara'na before the current name was adapted.

History

Football record
After few attempts, Misr eventually gained promotion to the Egyptian Premier League from the Second Division in 2009–10 for the first time in its history. It earned promotion after a 2–0 win against Wadi El Gedid FC at home ground. Misr Lel Makasa came top on its group ahead of Telephonaat Bani Suweif FC. El Mekkasa finished 2016–17 Egyptian Premier League in the second position to be the second time for the team to finish in the top four and first time to qualify to the CAF Champions League.

Performance in CAF competitions
PR = Preliminary round
FR = First round
SR = Second round
PO = Play-off round

Current squad

Managers

 Ahmed Abdel Halim (July 1, 2009 – May 23, 2010)
 Tarek Yehia (June 6, 2010 – Oct 3, 2012)
 Mohamed Abdel-Galil (Oct 6, 2012 – Feb 27, 2013)
 Hossam Hassan (Feb 26, 2013 – May 28, 2013)
 Tarek Yehia (May 27, 2013 – 2014)
 Ehab Galal (July 19, 2014 – 2017)
 Talaat Youssef (Feb 17, 2019 – April 20, 2019)
 Jamal Omar (April 22, 2019 – June 9, 2019)
 Mido (June 10, 2019 – Jan 21, 2020)
 Jamal Omar (caretaker) (Jan 21, 2020 – Jan 31, 2020)
 Emmanuel Amunike (Jan. 31, 2020 – Feb. 29, 2020)
 Ehab Galal (Feb. 29, 2020 – Sept. 22, 2020)
 Ali Ashour (Sept. 22, 2020 – Oct. 12, 2020)
 Jamal Omar (caretaker) (Oct. 12, 2020 – Nov. 26, 2020)
 Ehab Galal (Nov. 26, 2020 – Mar. 19, 2021)
 Mohamed Azima (Mar. 24, 2021 – Jun. 28, 2021)
 Mohamed Abdel-Galil (Jun. 29, 2021 – present)

References

Football clubs in Egypt
Sports clubs in Egypt
Clubs and societies in Egypt
1937 establishments in Egypt
Association football clubs established in 1937